Andis Juška and Deniss Pavlovs were the defending champions; however, they both chose not to participate this year.

Michail Elgin and Alexandre Kudryavtsev won this tournament. They defeated Radu Albot and Andrey Kuznetsov 7–6(7–4), 2–6, [10–7] in the final.

Seeds

Draw

Draw

References
 Doubles Draw

Samarkand Challenger - Doubles
Samarkand Challenger